Youth Violence and Juvenile Justice is a quarterly peer-reviewed academic journal that covers the field of criminology and juvenile law. Its Co-editors are Chad R. Trulson (University of North Texas) and Jonathan W. Caudill (University of Colorado, Colorado Springs). It was established in 2003 and is currently published by SAGE Publications.

Abstracting and indexing 
Youth Violence and Juvenile Justice is abstracted and indexed in Scopus and the Social Sciences Citation Index. According to the Journal Citation Reports, its 2017 impact factor is 1.796, ranking it 23 out of 61 journals in the category "Criminology & Penology".

References

External links 
 

SAGE Publishing academic journals
English-language journals
Quarterly journals
Criminology journals
Publications established in 2003
Juvenile law
Violence journals